The 2010 season of the Polish American Football League (PLFA I) was the 5th season played by the major american football league in Poland. Regular season play was held from March 27 to July 4, 2010. The Polish champion title was eventually won by the Devils Wrocław when they defeated The Crew Wrocław; the Polish Bowl championship game, at the Niskie Ląki stadium in Wrocław, Lower Silesian Voivodeship on July 24.

Regular season

Playoffs 
Top four teams was qualify to the play-offs.

Bracket

Semi-finals 
 July 10, Wrocław
 The Crew vs. Seahawks 49:0
 July 11, Wrocław
 Devils vs. Eagles 54:13

Polish Bowl V 
 July 24, 2010
 Wrocław
 Niskie Łąki stadium
 Attendance: 1,200
 MVP: Dawid Tarczyński (Devils)

See also 
 2010 in sports

References

External links 
 Polish American Football Association

Polish American Football League seasons
Poland
Plfa Season, 2010